The Fanfani IV Cabinet was the 17th cabinet of the Italian Republic, which held office from 22 February 1962 to 22 June 1963, for a total of 485 days, or 1 year and 4 months.

The government was presented to the chambers on 2 March 1962. The trust was voted in the Chamber of Deputies on 10 March, which was approved with 295 votes in favor, 195 against and the abstention of the PSI, while in the Senate the vote of trust took place on 15 March, which was approved with 122 votes in favor and 68 against.

On 18 June the Council of Ministers approved the law for the nationalization of electricity, one of the main points of the PSI program and which was approved by the parliament in November, and the Electricity Authority was established with the consequent transfer to it of the electrical industries. At the end of November there was a reshuffle with the replacement of some ministers and some undersecretaries and the changes were approved by the Chamber on 5 December by the Senate on 6 December.

From 4 to 8 January 1963 meetings between the secretaries of the respective parties were held in order to find a compromise between the various parties that supported the government to define how to conclude the legislature. In particular there were disagreements between DC and PSI on the law for the implementation of the regional order, that the DC would like to condition to the breaking of the PSI with the PCI in the local institutions. However, given the now close conclusion of the legislature, the PSI excluded the government crisis.

The parliament was dissolved on 18 February and the president Antonio Segni announced early election.

Party breakdown
 Christian Democracy (DC): prime minister, deputy prime minister, 18 ministers, 32 undersecretaries
 Italian Democratic Socialist Party (PSDI): 3 ministers, 5 undersecretaries
 Italian Republican Party (PRI): 2 ministers, 1 undersecretary

Composition

References

Italian governments
1962 establishments in Italy
1963 disestablishments in Italy
Cabinets established in 1962
Cabinets disestablished in 1963